Radler is a surname. Notable people with the surname include:
 Błażej Radler (born 1982, Rydułtowy), Polish professional footballer
 F. David Radler (born 1944, Montreal, Quebec), Canadian executive and close associate of Conrad Black
 Dorothy Raedler (born 1917, New York City)
 Johann Rädler (born 1952), Austrian politician (ÖVP)
 Josef Karl Rädler (1844–1917), Austrian porcelain painter
 Antonie Rädler (1899–1991), Marian religious visionary who founded the Maria vom Sieg shrine in Wigratzbad

References